Ryszard Głowacki (born 1937 in Dukla, Poland) is a Polish engineer of geology, writer, publicist and a science fiction author of 3 novels and almost 30 short stories.

References

External links
Webpage

1937 births
Living people
Polish engineers
Polish science fiction writers
Date of birth missing (living people)